Naoko Kijimuta (Japanese: 雉子牟田 直子 Kijimuta Naoko, born March 26, 1972) is a retired tennis player and winner of five professional doubles tournaments. She has been a representative of Japan in the Federation Cup.

Career
In the 1990s with her sister Akiko, she ranked among the top tennis players in Japan, alongside such players as Kimiko Date and Naoko Sawamatsu. From 1995 to 1997, she figured in the world top 100 in singles, taking a highest ranking in March 1997 - No. 44 (the season ended 1996 as the world's 50th best player).

Naoko's best results include the singles semifinals of the WTA Tour tournament in Jakarta (defeated by top-seeded Belgian Sabine Appelmans) and (Japan Open) in 1996, quarterfinals in Strasbourg in 1997, third rounds at the 1996 US Open and 1997 Wimbledon.

Greater successes she had in doubles, where she was ranked 18th in October 1997, and won five tournaments including WTA Tour events and another five lower-ranking (ITF Women's Circuit). All titles on the WTA Tour came with Japanese partners - Rika Hiraki, Miho Saeki and mostly with Nana Miyagi. Miyagi won three tournaments and twice was in the quarterfinal of a Grand Slam tournament (Australian Open 1997 and 1998).

Kijimuta and Miyagi also appeared in several semifinals and sometimes in the last eight of Grand Slam events (Wimbledon, French Open and US Open in 1997, as well as Wimbledon in 1998 - this time victory over the Williams sisters by default).

Naoko Kijimuta played doubles in the Federation Cup 1997 and 1998, partnering Nana Miyagi and Kyoko Nagatsuka, but lost all three games.

Her tennis career ended in September 1998, at the Toyota Princess Cup tournament in Tokyo, where she passed the qualifying in the singles to be defeated in the first round of the main draw by German Anke Huber in three sets. Also the first round of the tournament in doubles (along with Rika Hiraki) ended in defeat.

Her career earnings was almost half a million dollars.

WTA career finals

Doubles: 6 (5 titles, 1 runner-up)

ITF Circuit finals

Singles (0–1)

Doubles (5–3)

External links
 
 
 

1972 births
Living people
People from Ebina, Kanagawa
Japanese female tennis players
Sportspeople from Kanagawa Prefecture